may refer to:

Places
 Aoyama, Tokyo, Japan
 Aoyama Gakuin University, a university located in Aoyama, Tokyo
 Aoyama-itchōme Station, a railway station in Minato, Tokyo, Japan
 Aoyama, Mie, formerly a town in Naga District, but now part of the city of Iga, Mie Prefecture, Japan
 Aoyama Station (Iwate), a railway station located in Takizawa, Iwate, Japan

People
 Aoyama (surname)
 Aoyama clan, a Japanese clan which came to prominence during the Sengoku period, and is the namesake of the Aoyama neighborhood in Tokyo

Other uses
 Aoyama Harp, a Japanese harp manufacturer
 Aoyama Crows, a 2002 live album

See also
Qingshan (disambiguation), places in China with the same Chinese name
Castle Peak (disambiguation), places in Hong Kong with the same Chinese name